Herbert Bruce Enderton (April 15, 1936 – October 20, 2010) was an American mathematician. He was a Professor Emeritus of Mathematics at UCLA and a former member of the faculties of Mathematics and of Logic and the Methodology of Science at the University of California, Berkeley.

Enderton also contributed to recursion theory, the theory of definability, models of analysis, computational complexity, and the history of logic.

He earned his Ph.D. at Harvard in 1962. He was a member of the American Mathematical Society from 1961 until his death.

Personal life
He lived in Santa Monica. He married his wife, Cathy, in 1961 and they had two sons; Eric and Bert.

Later years
From 1980 to 2002 he was coordinating editor of the reviews section of the Association for Symbolic Logic's Journal of Symbolic Logic.

Death
He died from leukemia in 2010.

Selected publications

References

External links
 Herbert B. Enderton home page
 Enderton publications
 Herbert Enderton UCLA lectures on YouTube

1936 births
2010 deaths
20th-century American mathematicians
21st-century American mathematicians
American logicians
Mathematical logicians
Set theorists
Harvard University alumni
University of California, Berkeley College of Letters and Science faculty
University of California, Los Angeles faculty
Place of birth missing